Daniel Scheil (born 13 January 1973) is a German Paralympic athlete competing in F33-classification discus throw and shot put events. He represented Germany at the 2016 Summer Paralympics held in Rio de Janeiro, Brazil and he won the gold medal in the men's shot put F33 event.

At the 2014 European Championships held in Swansea, United Kingdom, he won the gold medals in the men's discus throw F34 and in the men's javelin throw F34 events. Two years later he won two silver medals: both in the men's shot put F33 event and in the men's discus throw F34 event.

At the World Championships he won the bronze medal in 2015 in the men's shot put F33 event and in 2017 he won the silver medal in the men's shot put F33 event.

References

External links 
 
 

1973 births
Living people
German male discus throwers
German male javelin throwers
German male shot putters
Paralympic athletes of Germany
Paralympic gold medalists for Germany
Paralympic medalists in athletics (track and field)
Athletes (track and field) at the 2016 Summer Paralympics
Athletes (track and field) at the 2020 Summer Paralympics
Medalists at the 2016 Summer Paralympics
Place of birth missing (living people)
20th-century German people
21st-century German people